Bradley Matthew Hawkins (born November 16, 1975) is an American politician of the Republican Party. He is a member of the Washington State Senate and a former member of the Washington House of Representatives, representing the 12th Legislative District from 2013–2017.

Awards 
 2014 Guardians of Small Business award. Presented by NFIB.

Personal life 
Hawkins' wife is Shawna Hawkins. They have two children. Hawkins and his family live in East Wenatchee, Washington.

References

1975 births
Living people
Republican Party members of the Washington House of Representatives
21st-century American politicians
Politicians from Spokane, Washington
People from East Wenatchee, Washington
Republican Party Washington (state) state senators